Panton is a Scottish and English surname. Notable people with the surname include:

Alexander Panton, Australian politician
Catherine Panton-Lewis, Scottish golfer
David Morrieson Panton (1870–1955), English cleric
Diana Panton, Canadian singer
Diomedes Panton, Filipino cyclist
Frank Panton, British military scientist
George Panton, British botanist
Giles Panton, Canadian actor
Jane Ellen Panton (1847–1923), English writer
Javier González Panton, Cuban volleyball player
John Panton, Scottish golfer
John Panton (MP), Welsh politician
John Panton (Australian politician), Australian politician
Joseph Anderson Panton, Scottish-Australian magistrate
Lucy Panton, British journalist
Paul Panton, Welsh barrister and antiquarian
Peter Panton, Australian racing cyclist
Verma Panton, Jamaican architect
Verner Panton, Danish designer
Wayne Panton, Caymanian Premier
William Panton, Scottish merchant

See also 
Panton Corbett, English politician